Stanley Ross was a moniker used by American indie songwriter Nicholas Meiers based in Chicago. Meiers is also the owner/operator of Nodak Records, a split seven-inch vinyl label based in Chicago. Meiers began performing as Stanley Ross, solo or with a band, in 2004. He has performed in numerous bands over the years, including Lardo, Soft Jolts, Devin Davis, Love Story in Blood Red, The Last Cannibals, Harbor Lights, and Barbeau.  In 2011, Meiers appeared vocally on the debut album of Chicago-based band Phantom Works.  Nicholas Meiers is also the grandson of former North Dakota Lt. Governor Ruth Meiers.

Discography

Studio albums
 2009: Here With Me (out of print)
 2008: Favorites (out of print)

EPs
 2010: MN-EP (recorded with Gary Burger of The Monks, distributed at RockProper.com)
 2006: Nelsonain (produced by American indie musician Devin Davis)

Compilation appearances
 2006: "Shrug it Off" on Justice Music Project compilation CD

Singles
 2009: "Chin Music" online only via iTunes
 2004: "Sycamore Song" on Nodak Records (split 7-inch with Love Story in Blood Red)

External links
 
 Stanley Ross on Myspace
 The week in Pop: My favorite things by Whitney Matheson, USA Today (Dec. 7, 2007)

Year of birth missing (living people)
Living people
American businesspeople
Musicians from Chicago
People from Bismarck, North Dakota
Writers from Chicago
Songwriters from Illinois